Jakub Grič (born 5 July 1996) is a Slovak professional footballer who plays for Dynamo České Budějovice in the Czech First League as a midfielder.

Club career

Zemplín Michalovce
Grič won the 2014–15 DOXXbet liga with Zemplín Michalovce, earning the club its first promotion to the top tier of Slovak football. 

He made his Fortuna Liga debut for Michalovce in the starting line-up against AS Trenčín, on 18 July 2015.

Spartak Trnava
In July 2020, Grič had signed with Spartak Trnava, citing contention at signing with a club, with a notable name at home and abroad. Grič was of interest for Spartak on the grounds of his past performances and usefulness on different defensive positions.

Dynamo České Budějovice
In July 2022, Grič had signed with Czech side Dynamo České Budějovice.

International career
Grič was first recognised in a senior national team nomination on 16 March 2022 by Štefan Tarkovič as an alternate ahead of four UEFA Nations League fixtures against Belarus, Azerbaijan and Kazakhstan scheduled in first two weeks of June 2022.

Honours
Spartak Trnava
Slovak Cup: 2021–22

References

External links
 MFK Zemplín Michalovce official profile
 Futbalnet profile 
 

1996 births
Living people
Sportspeople from Prešov
Slovak footballers
Slovak expatriate footballers
Slovakia youth international footballers
Association football midfielders
MFK Zemplín Michalovce players
Sandecja Nowy Sącz players
FC Spartak Trnava players
2. Liga (Slovakia) players
Slovak Super Liga players
Ekstraklasa players
Expatriate footballers in Poland
Slovak expatriate sportspeople in Poland
SK Dynamo České Budějovice players
Expatriate footballers in the Czech Republic
Slovak expatriate sportspeople in the Czech Republic